Chondroitin sulfate synthase 2 is an enzyme that in humans is encoded by the CHPF gene.

References

External links

Further reading